In Greek mythology, Enorchus (Ancient Greek: Ἐνόρχης) or Enorches (Enorchês) was a son of Thyestes by his sister Daeta. He was born out of an egg and built a temple to Dionysus, who was hence called Dionysus Enorches, though Enorches may also describe the god as the dancer.

See also
List of Greek mythological figures

Notes

References

Epithets of Dionysus
Dance in Greek mythology